Patty Larkin (born June 19, 1951) is an American singer-songwriter and guitarist based in Boston, Massachusetts. She is a founding member of Four Bitchin' Babes. Her music has been described as folk-urban pop music.

Life and career
Patty Larkin was born in Des Moines, Iowa, United States, and grew up in a musical and artistic family in Milwaukee, Wisconsin. Descended from a long line of Irish-American singers and storytellers, her mother was a painter and her sisters both musicians. She learned at a young age to appreciate the beauty and magic of the arts. She began classical piano studies at age 7, and became swept up in the sounds of pop and folk in the 1960s, teaching herself the guitar and experimenting with songwriting in high school. An English major, Larkin sang throughout her high school and college career, starting out in coffeehouses in Oregon and San Francisco. Upon graduation from the University of Oregon, she moved to Boston, Massachusetts, where she devoted herself to music, busking on the streets of Cambridge and studying jazz guitar at Berklee College of Music and with Boston area jazz guitarists.

Her recording career began in 1985 with Philo/Rounder Records where she recorded Step into The Light, I'm Fine, and Live in the Square. In 1990, she signed to Windham Hill's new High Street label and delivered four releases: Tango, Angels Running, Strangers World, and Perishable Fruit. After Windham Hill was sold to BMG, Larkin moved to Vanguard Records and released à gogo, Regrooving The Dream, Red=Luck, and Watch The Sky. The latter was a New York Times "critic choice". In 2010, Larkin celebrated her 25th year of recording with 25, a stripped down retrospective of 25 love songs with 25 featured guests (Road Narrows Records/Signature Sounds).

Larkin produced La Guitara, a compilation of international women guitarists challenging the notion that there are no great women guitarists. She has also performed on numerous compilations and her songs have been featured in the following films:  "Anyway The Main Thing Is" in Evolution (Columbia/DreamWorks); "Good Thing" in Random Hearts (Columbia); and "Coming Up For Air" and "Tenderness on the Block" in Sliding Doors (Miramax/Paramount). Cher recorded Larkin's "Angels Running" on her album It's a Man's World.

Larkin is the recipient of an honorary doctorate of music degree from Berklee College of Music. She has also been honored by Boston's Mayor Thomas Menino with "Patty Larkin Appreciation Day" for her career in music and philanthropic contributions.

Personal life
She currently lives with her partner and two adopted children in Wellfleet, Massachusetts.

Discography

References

External links

 
 FolkLib entry for Patty Larkin
 Patty Larkin: 25 Songs, 25 Friends, 25 Years – interview by NPR

1951 births
American women singer-songwriters
American folk guitarists
American folk singers
American people of Irish descent
Berklee College of Music alumni
American lesbian musicians
American LGBT singers
American LGBT songwriters
LGBT people from Iowa
Lesbian singers
Lesbian songwriters
Musicians from Boston
Musicians from Des Moines, Iowa
Living people
Four Bitchin' Babes members
Guitarists from Iowa
Guitarists from Massachusetts
20th-century American guitarists
Signature Sounds artists
20th-century American women guitarists
20th-century American LGBT people
21st-century American LGBT people
21st-century American women
Singer-songwriters from Iowa
Singer-songwriters from Massachusetts